Halimium halimifolium is a species of flowering plant in the family Cistaceae, native to Mediterranean Basin.

References

halimifolium